Tamil Nadu Physical Education and Sports University (TNPESU) is a state-run university in Chennai, Tamil Nadu, India, established in 2005. It is first public sports university established in India. It is a residential university. YMCA College of Physical Education is an affiliated college of this university.

Departments
 Department of Physical Education  
 Department of Yoga  
 Department of Exercise Physiology and Biomechanics  
 Department of Sports Psychology and Sports Management  
 Department of Advanced Sports Coaching and Sports Technology

The university offers courses such as BSc, MSc, MPhil, PhD, MTech, MBA, MA, BPED, MPED, BPES.

See also
 List of universities in India
 List of Tamil Nadu Government's Educational Institutions

References

External links 
 

Sport in Tamil Nadu
Sport schools in India
Universities in Chennai
Physical education in India
Physical Education and Sports universities in India
2005 establishments in Tamil Nadu
Educational institutions established in 2005